The Parma Challenger is a professional tennis tournament played on clay courts. It is part of the Association of Tennis Professionals (ATP) Challenger Tour. It is held in Parma, Italy.

Past finals

Singles

Doubles

See also
Emilia-Romagna Open
Internazionali di Tennis Città di Parma

References

ATP Challenger Tour
Clay court tennis tournaments
Tennis tournaments in Italy